Tammie Shannon (born June 13, 1969) is an American blues singer-songwriter best known for her track "I Got Rhythm." As a child, Tammie received early musical exposure touring with Percy Sledge before taking a break from the arts to focus on family and business. Tammie recently partnered with Grammy-nominated producer Kent Wells and her return album, entitled All of Me, is expected Spring 2018. Tammie is based in Nashville, TN and has received media attention from Words Music and News, Vents Magazine, No Depression, Nashville Downtown, Now Playing Nashville, Rock and Blues Muse, and Blues Gambler.

References

1969 births
Living people
American blues singer-songwriters
Musicians from Arkansas